Milan Petronijević (11 November 1831 — 14 October 1914) was a Serbian politician and diplomat who served as the Minister of Foreign Affairs from 1867 to 1868.

Biography 
Petronijević was born in 1831 in Jagodina which at that time was part of the Principality of Serbia. His father Avram Petronijević was a Prime Minister and the Minister of Foreign Affairs.

He started off his diplomatic career as an Ambassador of Serbia to the Ottoman Empire from 1854 to 1861. Later, he was the President of the Theater Board from 9 December 1864 to 13 July 1868. He was a representative of the Minister of Foreign Affairs Jovan Ristić from 3 to 21 November 1867.

On 21 November 1867, he got appointed Minister of Foreign Affairs and served until 21 June 1868. After leaving this position, all of his further engagements were in diplomacy as he was an Ambassador of Serbia in Bucharest from 1873 to 1880, Ambassador in Berlin from 1880 to 1888, Ambassador in Vienna from 1889 to 1890 and an Ambassador in St. Petersburg from 1890 to 1897.

He also served as the President of the State Council.

Personal life 
In 1855, Petronijević married Cleopatra, the daughter of the Prince of Serbia Alexander Karađorđević. After Cleopatra's unexpected death, he married for the second time, this time with Jelisaveta Cukić, daughter of Petar Lazarević Cukić and granddaughter of Duke Pavle Cukić by her father, and Duke Petar Nikolajević Moler by mother, the sister of Kosta Cukić. Milan Petronijević and Jelisaveta Petronijević (1837-1915) had a son, Miloš and two daughters.

Awards 
  Order of Saint Vladimir, 2nd degree

References 

Serbian diplomats
Government ministers of Serbia
People from Jagodina
1831 births
1914 deaths
Foreign ministers of Serbia